Hugh Harra (born 29 March 1936) was a Scottish footballer who played for Falkirk and Dumbarton.

References

1936 births
Scottish footballers
Dumbarton F.C. players
Falkirk F.C. players
Scottish Football League players
Living people
Rutherglen Glencairn F.C. players
Association football midfielders